Escape Clause is a 1996 made-for-TV film directed by Brian Trenchard-Smith.

Premise
The film is a murder mystery about an insurance agent/advertising executive (Andrew McCarthy) accused of his wife's murder.  He claims that his wife had paid a hit-man/contract killer/assassin to eliminate him - but she is killed before he can discover the truth about the allegation.

References

External links

Escape Clause at TCMDB

1996 television films
1996 films
American mystery films
American television films
Films scored by Ken Thorne
Films directed by Brian Trenchard-Smith
1990s English-language films
1990s American films